is a passenger railway station in the city of Futtsu, Chiba Prefecture, Japan, operated by the East Japan Railway Company (JR East).

Lines
Hamakanaya Station is served by the Uchibo Line, and is located 64.0 km from the starting point of the line at Soga Station.

Station layout
The station consists of a single island platform serving two tracks, connected to the station building by a footbridge. The station has a "Midori no Madoguchi" ticket office.

Platforms

History
Hamakanaya Station opened on October 11, 1916. The station was absorbed into the JR East network upon the privatization of the Japanese National Railways (JNR) on April 1, 1987.

Passenger statistics
In fiscal 2019, the station was used by an average of 237 passengers daily (boarding passengers only).

Surrounding area
 Nokogiriyama Ropeway
 Kanaya Port
 Tokyo-Wan Ferry (to Kurihama, Port of Yokosuka)

See also
 List of railway stations in Japan

References

External links

 JR East Station information 

Railway stations in Japan opened in 1916
Railway stations in Chiba Prefecture
Uchibō Line
Futtsu